The Navacerrada Pass is a mountain pass in the Guadarrama Mountains, in the centre of the Iberian Peninsula.

In 1788, it replaced the Fuenfría Pass as mountain pass in the route crossing the Sierra de Guadarrama connecting the Spanish cities of Madrid and Segovia. The saddle point lies at 1,858 metres over sea level. It is located in the border between the province of Segovia and the Community of Madrid. As of 2019, several of the Alpine buildings erected in the surroundings are derelict.

See also
C-9 (Cercanías Madrid)

References 

Mountain passes of Spain
Sierra de Guadarrama
Mountain passes of the Sistema Central